Puta's Fever is the second studio album by Mano Negra, released in 1989. The French edition of Rolling Stone magazine named it the 8th greatest French rock album (out of 100).

Track listing

Personnel
Mano Negra
 Oscar Tramor (Manu Chao) – lead vocals, guitar
 Tonio Del Borño (Antoine Chao) – trumpet, vocals
 Santiago "El Águila" Casariego – drums, vocals
 Garbancito (Philippe Teboul) – percussion, vocals
 Roger Cageot (Daniel Jamet) – lead guitar, vocals
 Jo (Joseph Dahan) – bass guitar, vocals
 Helmut Krumar (Thomas Darnal) – keyboards, vocals
 Krøpöl 1er (Pierre Gauthé) – trombone, vocals

Guest musicians
 Mme Oscar (Anouk) – vocals
 Napo "Chihuahua" Romero – vocals
 Alain "L'Enclume De Choisy" Wampas – double bass, vocals
 Zofia   – vocals

Charts

Certifications and sales

 (select "Mano Negra" from drop-down list)</ref>}}

References

External links
 

1989 albums
Mano Negra (band) albums